The 1st constituency of Bács-Kiskun County is one of the single member constituencies of the National Assembly, the national legislature of Hungary. The constituency standard abbreviation: Bács-Kiskun 01. OEVK.

Since 2014, it has been represented by László Salacz of the Fidesz–KDNP party alliance.

Geography
The 1st constituency is located in north-western part of Bács-Kiskun County.

List of municipalities
The constituency includes the following municipalities:

Members
The constituency was first represented by László Salacz of the Fidesz from 2014, and he was re-elected in 2018 and 2022.

References

Bács-Kiskun 1st